Historically, the city of Barcelona, in the Spanish autonomous community of Catalonia, had a large tramway network. The city's first tram line opened in 1872, but almost all of these historic lines had closed by 1971, being replaced by buses and by the expanding Barcelona Metro. The one remaining line, the Tramvia Blau, was retained as tourist attraction, using historic rolling stock. However at the beginning of the 21st century, two new tram systems, the Trambaix and Trambesòs, opened in the suburbs of the city.

History
The first tramway line in Barcelona was the Barcelona-Gràcia (Josepets), a horse tramway that opened by the Barcelona Tramways company on June 28, 1872. Within a few years, lines were built throughout Barcelona and many of its surrounding villages. As the tramways helped to integrate the metropolis, these villages became quarters of today's Barcelona.

Lines were built by a number of companies, but by the 1900s the two main companies were Barcelona Tramways and Compañía General de Tranvías. Electrification took place in the 1900s, with the introduction of route numbers following from 1910 onwards. In 1925, the two main companies merged to Tranvías de Barcelona (TB). The Spanish Civil War (1936–39) caused major damage to the tramways.

Services recovered in the 1950s and 1960s, and double-decker trams were used to operate some services. In the early 1960s, a fleet of 101 PCC cars were purchased second-hand from the United States city of Washington and, after modification, placed in service in Barcelona.

However closures then started to happen. With the exception of the Tramvia Blau, the last two tramway lines operated on March 18, 1971. For the next thirty years or so, this one short line was the only tramway in Barcelona.

Towards the end of the 1980s a number of new tramways were opened in other European cities, and Barcelona started to consider the possibility of building new lines. To test this idea, in 1997 a short test tramway was built along the Diagonal with just two tram stops. Tests were conducted with a tram from the Grenoble tram system in June 1997, and a month later with a Siemens Combino.

The tests were successful, and the decision was made to build two new tram systems, both operating on parts of the Diagonal, although not interconnected. Both lines commenced operation in 2004, with TramBaix in the west starting on April 5, whilst Trambesòs in the east commenced on May 8.

Current situation

Tramvia Blau

It links the Avinguda Tibidabo terminus of Barcelona Metro line L7 with the lower station of the Funicular del Tibidabo, thus providing part of a through link from the city centre to Tibidabo.

Tramvia Blau is operated by Transports Metropolitans de Barcelona (TMB), albeit not part of Autoritat del Transport Metropolità (ATM) and therefore not fare-integrated with the other public transportation networks of the metropolitan area; ticketing is paid cash only to the tram operators. The line is operated with a fleet of seven tram cars dating from between 1901 and 1906.

Trambaix

The Trambaix is a light rail (tram) system connecting the Baix Llobregat area with the city of Barcelona. It includes three routes (T1, T2 and T3), which have an inner terminus at Plaça Francesc Macià, to the west of the city centre, and extend west, passing L'Hospitalet de Llobregat, Esplugues de Llobregat, Cornellà de Llobregat, Sant Joan Despí, Sant Just Desvern and Consell Comarcal in Sant Feliu de Llobregat.

The Trambaix is operated by the TramMet company and is part of the ATM network and is fare-integrated with the other public transportation networks of the metropolitan area. The line uses a fleet of Alstom Citadis trams.

Trambesòs

Trambesòs is a light rail (tram) system, consisting of three routes that connect the district of Sant Martí in Barcelona to Badalona and Sant Adrià de Besòs municipalities. Its name comes from the union of the words "tram", an abbreviation of the Catalan word tramvia, and "Besòs", the name of an area in northern Barcelonès dominated by river Besòs.

Like the Trambaix, Trambesòs is operated by the TramMet company and is part of the ATM network and is fare-integrated with the other public transportation networks of the metropolitan area. It uses the same type of rolling stock as the Trambaix system.

Network Map

See also
List of tram stops in Barcelona metropolitan area

References

External links

Track plan of the current Barcelona tram system

 
Barcelona trams
Trams in Barcelona
Barcelona trams
Barcelona
Barcelona